The Serbian Women's Volleyball League is a Women's volleyball competition organized by the Volleyball Federation of Serbia (Odbojkaški know Srbije, OSSRB).

History 
The Serbian Women's Volleyball League Was created in 2006/07 Season after the dissolution of the former First League of Serbia and Montenegro several teams from around Serbia has participated as of 2019/20 Season the League have 10 teams participating, however the League is dominated mostly by two teams from Belgrade, OK Vizura 5 titles a record holder then in second place comes OK Crvena Zvezda with four titles.

List of Champions

Table by club

References

External links
Serbian Volleyball Federation
 Serbian Superleague. women.volleybox.net 

Serbia
Volleyball in Serbia
Serbian Superliga
Professional sports leagues in Serbia